Alfred White (4 October 1879 – 15 December 1962) was an Australian cricketer. He played four first-class matches for New South Wales between 1905/06 and 1908/09.

See also
 List of New South Wales representative cricketers

References

External links
 

1879 births
1962 deaths
Australian cricketers
New South Wales cricketers
People from Mudgee
Cricketers from New South Wales